American recording artist Whitney Houston, nicknamed “The Voice”, recorded songs for her seven studio albums and her two soundtrack albums, as well as contributing songs to two other soundtracks (Waiting to Exhale and Sparkle). Her self-titled debut album was released on February 14, 1985. It peaked at number one on US Billboard 200 album chart, a position it held for 14 consecutive weeks. "You Give Good Love" was released as the lead single, written for Houston by La La and produced by Kashif,  becoming Houston's first top ten single. The final three singles to be released from the album, "Saving All My Love for You", "How Will I Know" and "Greatest Love of All", all topped the US Billboard Hot 100 singles chart. This marked the first time in the chart's history that a debut album, and a debut album released by a female artist, had generated three number one singles.

Houston released her second studio album, Whitney, on June 2, 1987. The album became the first by a female artist to debut atop the US Billboard 200 album chart, a position it held for 11 weeks. "I Wanna Dance with Somebody (Who Loves Me)" was released as the lead single. The dance-pop song was written by George Merrill and Shannon Rubicam. It was ranked at number 88 on Slant Magazine's list of the 100 Greatest Dance Songs in 2006. "I Wanna Dance With Somebody (Who Loves Me)", along with the following three singles to be released from Whitney, ("Didn't We Almost Have It All", "So Emotional" and "Where Do Broken Hearts Go"), all peaked at number one on the US Billboard Hot 100 singles chart. Houston holds for the record for the most consecutive number one singles on the chart, with seven. Her third studio album, I'm Your Baby Tonight, was released on November 6, 1990. It was decided by her record label executive, Clive Davis at Arista Records, that Houston should grow as an artist and develop her music further by making an R&B album instead of another pop music album. Davis enlisted L.A. Reid and Babyface to compose more R&B driven songs. The title track was released as the lead single from the album, and it was written by Reid and Babyface. It topped the US Hot R&B/Hip-Hop Songs chart. The second single, "All the Man That I Need", is an "expression of sexual hero worship" according to Stephen Holden writing for The New York Times.

Between 1992 and 1996, Houston recorded songs which were included on three different soundtrack albums. A cover of Dolly Parton's song, "I Will Always Love You", was released as the lead single from The Bodyguard soundtrack from the film of the same name in 1992. It peaked at number one on the Hot 100 for 14 weeks in 1992–1993. Houston broke the record for the longest running number one single since the chart's inception in 1958. Houston recorded three songs for the Waiting to Exhale soundtrack for the film of the same name, both of which were released in November 1995. "Exhale (Shoop Shoop)" was released as the lead single; it is an R&B ballad written by Babyface which summarizes the plot of the film. "Exhale (Shoop Shoop)" becomes the third single to debut at number one on the US Hot 100 in the history of the chart. The other two songs which she recorded for the album were "Why Does It Hurt So Bad", another R&B ballad penned by Babyface, and a duet with CeCe Winans called "Count On Me", co-written by Houston. Houston recorded a full length soundtrack to accompany the film The Preacher's Wife, both of which were released in 1996. Three singles were released to promote the film and album: "I Believe in You and Me", a cover of Annie Lennox's "Step by Step" and "My Heart Is Calling". The latter of the three draws musical inspiration from the genres of funk and gospel.

Houston released her fifth studio album, entitled Just Whitney in December 2002. The singer co-wrote the lead single, "Whatchulookinat", which was co-produced by her husband, Bobby Brown. The song is a response to how Houston considered herself to be a victim of unwanted media attention. The album's second single, "One of Those Days", is a slow R&B track with a retro feel. Houston released her first and only Christmas album in November 2003. She recorded cover versions of several traditional Christmas songs, including "The First Noel" and "Little Drummer Boy". "One Wish (For Christmas)" was released as the sole single from the album. Her sixth studio album, I Look to You, was released in August 2009. The title track is a gospel song, written by R. Kelly, which pertains to Houston's faith in God. The album's second single, "Million Dollar Bill", is an old school R&B song which was written by Alicia Keys, Swizz Beatz and Norman Harris.

Songs

See also
Whitney Houston discography

References

Houston, Whitney